Broken Chanter is the stage name of Scottish musician David MacGregor, a moniker he adopted in recognition of his poor attempts as a toddler to play his grandfather's chanter, which led to it being hidden from him.

Career

Origin and Broken Chanter LP

MacGregor was the principal songwriter of Kid Canaveral until guitarist Kate Lazda's departure led to the dissolution of the band in 2017. In early 2018, after writing demos in a closed gift shop in the Highlands and on the Isle of Skye, MacGregor travelled to County Donegal with drummer Audrey Tait and multi-instrumentalist/producer Gal to begin recording an album for an as-yet unnamed solo project. Working on a song a day, starting with a demo in the morning, interspersed with walks on one the numerous local beaches, the trio returned to Glasgow where the recording was finished. The resulting eponymous debut album as Broken Chanter was released to critical acclaim in September 2019 with The Skinny calling it "A Stunning, stately debut", and featured Audrey Tait, Gal, Jill O'Sullivan, Gav Prentice, Kim Carnie, Hannah Shepherd, and Emma Kupa.

COVID-19 pandemic and Catastrophe Hits

With touring to promote Broken Chanter cut short by the COVID-19 pandemic, MacGregor spent the many lockdowns recording and releasing ambient and instrumental EPs for Bandcamp Fridays. MacGregor stated that he did this to make sure that was remaining creative during the pandemic-required lockdowns.

MacGregor recorded the second Broken Chanter album at Chem 19 with producer Paul Savage in March and April 2021, having exchanged demos and notes during lockdown prior to in-person pre-production sessions when restrictions allowed. Catastrophe Hits was released on 29 October 2021 on Last Night From Glasgow and Olive Grove Records, going on to win The Weekender's Album of the Year award, and reaching number 7 in the Scottish Album Chart, number 10 in the UK Vinyl Chart, number 16 in the UK Independent Album Chart, and number 30 in the UK Physical Sales Chart. The album's first single Extinction Event Souvenir T-shirt was ranked at number 20 in The Herald's Top 100 songs of 2021.

Discography

Albums

Broken Chanter (2019)
Catastrophe Hits (2021) [#7 SCO; #10 UK Vinyl; #16 UK Indie; #29 UK Physical]

Singles

Wholesale (2019)
Should We Be Dancing? (2019)
Beside Ourselves (2020)
Extinction Event Souvenir T-Shirt (2021)
Dancing Skeletons (2021)
Allow Yourself (2022)

EPs

Don't Move To Denmark (2020)
Ambient 1: Music For Airing Cupboards (2020)
Ambient 2: Taking Mount Florida (By Strategy) (2020)
Ambient 3: Here Come The Warm Regrets (2020)
Ambient 4: Another Green Whirl (2020)
Ambient 5: The Shut It Assembly (2020)
Inside Broadcast - RenTV Session (2021)

References 

Scottish musicians

Scottish male guitarists
Scottish pop musicians
21st-century Scottish male singers
Living people
Year of birth missing (living people)